Reins are items of horse tack, used to direct a horse or other animal used for riding or driving.

Rein may also refer to:
Rein Abbey, Austria
Rein Abbey, Norway
Rein orchid or Piperia, a genus of the orchid family Orchidaceae
Reins, an archaic term for kidneys

People with the surname
Andrew Rein (born 1958), American wrestler
Bo Rein (1945–1980), American baseball and football player
 David Rein (1914–1979), American attorney 
Hans Rein, German sprint canoeist
Irving J. Rein, American communication scientist
Ivan Rein (1905–1943), Croatian painter
Johannes Justus Rein (1835–1918), a very perceptive German writer and traveler in East Asia
Jeff Rein (born 1953), American businessman
Jonas Rein (1760–1821), was a Norwegian priest, poet and politician
Kristoffer Rein (1912–1993), Norwegian politician
Manfred Rein (1948–2016), Austrian politician (ÖVP)
Mark Rein (journalist) (1909–1937?), Menshevik journalist
Mark Rein (software executive), vice president of Epic Games
Mercedes Rein (1930–2006), Uruguayan writer and dramatist
Ohad Rein, Australian singer/songwriter, stage name Old Man River
Paul Rein (born 1965), Swedish singer and songwriter
Thérèse Rein (born 1958), Australian businesswoman
Torald Rein (born 1968), German cross country skier
Torolf Rein (born 1934), Norwegian military officer
Trine Rein (born 1970), Norwegian singer
Wilhelm Rein (1847–1929), German educational theorist
Yevgeny Rein (born 1935), Russian poet and writer

People with the given name
 Rein (given name)

Fictional
Iwakura Rein, a character in of Serial Experiments Lain

See also
Reining, a type of western riding competition for horses
Child harness or walking reins
Rhine, one of the major rivers in Europe, called Rein in some languages
Mark Rein·Hagen (born 1964), Georgian-American role-playing game designer
Raine, first name or surname
Raein, an Italian screamo band
REIN, repetitive electrical impulse noise
RAINN, Rape, Abuse and Incest National Network
Rain (disambiguation)
Rane (disambiguation)
Rayne (disambiguation)
Reign (disambiguation)

Estonian-language surnames